Broadview Heights  is a city in Cuyahoga County, Ohio, United States, and a suburb in the Greater Cleveland area. The city's population was  19,936 at the 2020 census.

History

Early history
Native Americans once occupied the land that is now part of Broadview Heights. In 1811, Seth Paine, a surveyor sent by Colonel John Breck, became the first white man to settle the area. At the time, land now part of Brecksville, Broadview Heights, and North Royalton was known as Brecksville Township. A school was established in 1815 in a since-demolished building located at the intersection of Broadview Road and Avery Road.

Industry
By 1840, Brecksville Township had a cheese factory, a tannery, three distilleries, four saw mills, and multiple grist mills. A manual switchboard located near the intersection of Broadview Road and Wallings Road handled telephone calls for the region.

Incorporation
Broadview Heights was officially incorporated as a village on December 17, 1926 after a petition and an election among residents of the western portion of Brecksville Township. In 1927, Floyd C. Harris took office as the first mayor of Broadview Heights. 
In 1960, on the basis of census results indicating population growth, Broadview Heights became a city.

Recent history
The current City Hall campus was purchased by the city in 1996 for $750,000. At the time, Broadview Developmental Center, a hospital which had closed in the 1980s, stood on the site. Following the purchase, the site became known as Broadview Center and was renovated. In 1998, Recreation and Human Services moved to the Thorin Building, and City Hall was moved onto the campus in 1999. Buildings on the campus also came to be used by the police department and other local organizations. In 2006, the city demolished the unused portion of the former hospital and reclaimed the land. During the 2018 year, the city renovated and added on to the dated recreation center by adding new basketball courts, a new work out area, and a new pool.

Geography
Broadview Heights is located at  (41.321827, -81.676595).

Parks and recreational
The Broadview Heights Recreation Center is located at 9543 Broadview Road, which is also the same building that houses the town hall. The city renovated and added on to the former part of the old recreation center in 2018.

Demographics

Of the city's population over the age of 25, 46.4% hold a bachelor's degree or higher. Estimated median household income in 2013: $75,357 (it was $56,989 in 2000). Estimated per capita income in 2013: $38,647 (it was $29,440 in 2000).

2010 census
As of the census of 2010, there were 19,400 people, 7,698 households, and 5,255 families residing in the city. The racial makeup of the city was 91.0% White, 2.1% African American, 0.1% Native American, 5.2% Asian, 0.4% from other races, and 1.3% from two or more races. Hispanic or Latino of any race were 1.8% of the population.

There were 7,698 households, of which 33.3% had children under the age of 18 living with them, 56.9% were married couples living together, 8.4% had a female householder with no husband present, 2.9% had a male householder with no wife present, and 31.7% were non-families. 27.5% of all households were made up of individuals, and 9.6% had someone living alone who was 65 years of age or older. The average household size was 2.50 and the average family size was 3.09.

The median age in the city was 41.5 years. 24.6% of residents were under the age of 18; 6.4% were between the ages of 18 and 24; 24.7% were from 25 to 44; 29.6% were from 45 to 64; and 14.8% were 65 years of age or older. The gender makeup of the city was 48.1% male and 51.9% female.

2000 census

The median income for a household in the city was $56,989, and the median income for a family was $69,343. Males had a median income of $53,045 versus $33,597 for females. The per capita income for the city was $29,440. About 2.4% of families and 3.2% of the population were below the poverty line, including 4.1% of those under age 18 and 1.4% of those age 65 or over.

Education
See Brecksville-Broadview Heights High School and North Royalton High School.

Public schools
Broadview Heights students attend two school districts: Brecksville-Broadview Heights (shared with its neighboring city, Brecksville) and North Royalton (shared with neighbor North Royalton). There are three elementary schools, an intermediate school, a junior high school, and a high school in the Brecksville-Broadview Heights system.

In the North Royalton system, there is one elementary school, a middle school, and a high school . Before 2021, there were 3 elementary schools, now combined into one.  The division is roughly the north half of the city going to Brecksville-Broadview Heights and the south to North Royalton.

Academic rankings 
The Brecksville-Broadview Heights school system is highly rated.

PARCC tests, conducted in 2015 using the new Common Core standards, ranked Brecksville-Broadview Heights High School as the 12th best public high school in the entire state of Ohio.

In 2015, The Washington Post published the list of America's most challenging high schools. The analysis covered approximately 22,000 U.S. public high schools. The rankings were determined by taking the total number of Advanced Placement, International Baccalaureate and Advanced International Certificate of Education tests given at a school each year and divide by the number of seniors who graduated.  Brecksville-Broadview Heights High School ranked in the top 4 percent of all high schools in this assessment.

Brecksville-Broadview Heights High School has consistently been ranked by U.S. News & World Report magazine as being in the top 5 percent of all high schools in the United States.  Additionally, Brecksville-Broadview Heights High School was recognized in Newsweek magazine's 2013 list of the top 2000 public high schools in the United States.

In 2008, the U.S. Department of Education recognized Brecksville-Broadview Heights High School as an NCLB Blue Ribbon School. Brecksville-Broadview Heights High School was also a past nominee, by the Ohio Department of Education, for the prestigious Blue Ribbon School Award.

Sport championships 
In 2015, the girls' gymnastic team won its twelfth consecutive state title and fifteenth overall. The boys' wrestling team won the 2015 state championship.
The 1979 North Royalton High School boys' soccer team won the State Championship.

Art and writing awards 
In 2015, 27 Brecksville-Broadview Heights middle and high school art students received a total of 36 regional awards through the 35th Annual Scholastic Art & Writing Awards competition. Five students who have been awarded Gold Keys had their artwork judged on the national level in New York.

Private schools
The city is also the home of Assumption Academy, a Catholic elementary school, and Lawrence School, a school for children with learning differences.

Economy
Major employers include:

 Ohio Caterpillar (Ohio CAT)
 Brecksville-Broadview Heights School System
 Southwestern American Financial
 City of Broadview Heights
 Family Heritage Insurance

Healthcare
University Hospitals opened a new outpatient health center and freestanding emergency department in Broadview Heights in 2016, accessible from Ohio 82 and the Interstate 77 interchange. Construction on the $28 million, 52,000-square-foot project began in 2014; the structures sits on more than six acres, one block east of the interchange.

Another healthcare facility, the MetroHealth Brecksville Health Center, opened on the west side of the same interchange in 2016. Situated on land within both Broadview Heights and neighboring Brecksville, a joint tax sharing agreement was made between the two cities.

Churches
Broadview Heights is home to a number of churches, including Assumption, St. Sava Serbian Orthodox Church, and Cuyahoga Valley Church.

Theatre
The Broadview Heights Spotlights is a community theater program in Broadview Heights. The Spotlights perform in a theater owned by the city located on the grounds of the city hall next to the police station. The community theater offers a number of shows and classes throughout the year.

Notable people
 David J. Bronczek - CEO and President of FedEx Express and graduate of Brecksville-Broadview Heights High School
 Arthur Chu - Jeopardy Winner
 Michael T. Good - Astronaut and graduate of Brecksville-Broadview Heights High School
 Julián Tavárez - MLB pitcher

Surrounding communities

References

External links

 City of Broadview Heights
 North Royalton City School District
 Brecksville-Broadview Heights School District

Cities in Ohio
Cities in Cuyahoga County, Ohio
Populated places established in 1926
Cleveland metropolitan area